Deportes Antofagasta is a Chilean football club based in the city of Antofagasta currently playing in the Campeonato Nacional. The club's home stadium is the Estadio Bicentenario Calvo y Bascuñán, which has a capacity of 21,178.

History
The club was founded on May 14, 1966, when the amateur clubs Unión Bellavista and Portuario Atacama merged. The team's original name was Club de Deportes Antofagasta Portuario.

The team's first manager was Luis Santibañez, future manager of the Chile National Team. The team finished 10th in its first league season.

Under coach Francisco Hormazábal, Antofagasta was crowned champions of the second division in 1968.  The final was played on January 19, 1969 against San Luis.  The only goal of the match was scored by the Paraguayan player Juan Pelayo Ayala. The team was promoted to first division after that game.

On July 21, 1974 the team changed its name to Club Regional Antofagasta.

In 1977, the team finished 18th in the table and returned to the second level.

In 1979, Jorge León was named the team's president and changed the club's name to Club de Deportes Antofagasta.  The regional was not appropriate anymore, because a second team, Cobreloa, had been established in the Antofagasta Region.

On June 30, 1983 D. Antofagasta, coached by Manuel Rodríguez, returned to the top level once after defeating Lota Schwager 9–0. However the following year the team was again relegated.

D. Antofagasta experienced one of their most successful spans from 1991 through 1995, playing in the top tier under the guidance of Croatian coach Andrija Perčić, with star players such as Marco Cornez and Gabriel Caballero.

In 1997, they once again descended to the second level, after finishing at the bottom of the table.

In 2005, D. Antofagasta gained promotion to the first division along with Santiago Morning.

In 2008, the club returned to the Primera B, finishing at the bottom of the cumulative table 2007–08.

In 2011, they won the Primera B championship and were promoted to the Primera Division.

Stadium
Deportes Antofagasta  plays its home matches at the Estadio Regional de Antofagasta, owned by the Municipality of Antofagasta. The stadium was planned to be a reserve stadium for the FIFA World Cup 1962, and was finally inaugurated on October 8, 1964, on the grounds of the former Riding Club of Antofagasta. The first professional football match was played there in 1966, and Deportes Antofagasta has played there since that time. In 2007 the stadium was closed for repairs, and home games had to be played elsewhere; The Estadio Municipal de La Pintana in Santiago against Deportes Puerto Montt in Estadio Municipal de Calama against Huachipato and Estadio Carlos Dittborn, Arica against Lota Schwager, and until 2013 at the Estadio Parque Juan López.

Players

2021 Winter Transfers

In

Out

Former players

   Néstor Narbona

Managers

 Luis Santibáñez (1966)
 Santiago García (1967)
 Francisco Hormazábal (1968–69)
 Francisco Molina (1970–72)
 Luis Ibarra (1973)
 Raúl Pino (1974)
 Pedro Araya (1975)
 Hernán Carrasco (1975–76)
 Jaime Ramírez (1977)
 Domingo Gajardo (1977)
 Raúl Pino (1977)
 Donato Hernández (1977)
 Jorge Venegas (1978)
 Luis Rojo (1978–79)
 José Cárdenas (1980)
 Juan Páez (1981)
 Juan Letelier (1981)
 Manuel Rodríguez (1982)
 Juan Letelier (1983)
 Mario Páez (1983)
 Isaac Carrasco (1983)
 Jaime Campos (1983)
 Mario Páez (1984)
 Sergio Navarro (1985)
 Jaime Campos (1985)
 Miguel Arrué (1985)
 Alfonso Sepúlveda (1986)
 Humberto Cruz (1986)
 Miguel Arrué (1986)
 Hernán Godoy (1986–87)
 Jorge Molina (1988)
 José Sulantay (1988)
 Rolando García (1989)
 Mario Páez (1989)
 Jorge Luis Siviero (1990)
 Hugo Solís (1990)
 Mario Páez (1991)
 Andrija Perčić (1991–95)
 Mario Páez (1995–97)
 José Sulantay (1997)
 Dagoberto Olivares (1997–98)
 Mario Páez (1999)
 Rogelio Delgado (2000)
 Luis Marcoleta (2001–02)
 Mario Páez (2003–04)
 Carlos Rojas (2004)
 Hernán Ibarra (2005)
 Oscar Malbernat (2006)
 Fernando Díaz (Jan 1, 2007 – Dec 31, 2007)
 Mario Véner (2008)
 Hernán Ibarra (2008–10)
 Gustavo Huerta (Dec 30, 2010 – Feb 18, 2014)
 Jaime Vera (2014)
 Sergio Marchant (2014)
 José Cantillana (2015)
 Beñat San José (2015–)

Honors
Primera B: 2
1968, 2011

Copa Apertura Segunda División: 1
1990

South American cups history

Club Facts
 30 seasons in Campeonato Nacional: (1969-1977; 1983-1984; 1991-1997; 2006-2008; 2012-)
 25 seasons in Primera B: (1966-1968; 1978-1982; 1985-1990; 1998-2005; 2009-2011)
 1 appearance in Copa Sudamericana: (2019)
Highest home attendance  — 32,663 v. Colo-Colo (22 July 1973)
Primera División Best Position  — 4th (2018)
Copa Chile Best Season  — Semifinals (1992, 1994, 1996, 2014-15, 2017)

References

External links
 Official Website
 Antofagasta Supporter's Website

Antofagasta
Antofagasta
Association football clubs established in 1966
Sport in Antofagasta Region
1966 establishments in Chile